IFREMER  is an oceanographic institution in Brest, France.

Scope of works 
Ifremer focuses its research activities in the following areas: 
 Monitoring, use and enhancement of coastal seas 
 Monitoring and optimization of aquaculture production 
 Fishery resources 
 Exploration and exploitation of the oceans and their biodiversity 
 Circulation and marine ecosystems, mechanisms, trends and forecasting 
 Engineering of major facilities in the service of oceanography 
 Knowledge transfer and innovation in its fields of its activities

In 1985, Ifremer partnered with Dr. Robert Ballard for an ultimately-successful expedition to locate the wreck of the RMS Titanic. In 1994 Ifremer assisted in the salvage of the cargo from the SS John Barry.

Ifremer operates a number of vessels, including the submarine Nautile.

In 2008, Ifremer partnered with Dr. Bruce Shillito for the testing and initial operations of the PERISCOP, a deep sea fish recovery device.

Ifremer centres 
Ifremer is located in 26 sites, including 5 main centres (Boulogne, Brest, Nantes, Toulon et Tahiti), a headquarters (Brest). About twenty research departments are associated to these centres :

 Centre Manche - Mer du Nord, associated to Université Lille Nord de France
 Centre in Boulogne-sur-Mer
 Station of Port-en-Bessin
 Centre in Brest
 Station of Saint-Malo
 Station of Argenton-en-Landunvez
 Station of Concarneau
 Station of Lorient
 Station of La Trinité-sur-Mer
 Centre in Nantes
 Station of Bouin
 Station of La Rochelle
 Station of La Tremblade
 Station of Arcachon
 Laboratory of Bidart
 Centre Méditerranée (Toulon)
 Station of Sète
 Station of Palavas-les-Flots
 Unit of Montpellier
 Station of San-Giuliano
 Centre in Tahiti
 Délégation de Nouvelle-Calédonie
 Délégation of Guyane
 Délégation of la Réunion
 Délégation of Antilles

See also

Notes and references

External links

Ifremer's official website

1984 establishments in France
Research institutes established in 1984
Government agencies of France
Government-owned companies of France
Governmental nuclear organizations
Research institutes in France
Oceanographic organizations
Brest, France